Jo Ellison is Editor of How to Spend It, Financial Times.

Personal life 
Born in Cambridge and raised between London and Dubai, Ellison studied history at the University of Edinburgh. It was while studying in Edinburgh that she met her husband, playwright, Enda Walsh, while working in the theatre where Disco Pigs ran during the 1997 Fringe. She moved to Cork to live with him a year later. They currently live together in Kilburn with their daughter, Ada, and their cockapoo, Alvin.

Career 

Ellison's journalism career began the Irish Examiner and on moving back to London with Enda in 2006, she became features editor of The Independent, writing arts reviews and shaping articles. In 2008 she pursued an opportunity at British Vogue, where she became features editor, and then features director, before taking over as fashion editor at the Financial Times from Vanessa Friedman who moved to The New York Times in 2014. She was the second-ever person to inhabit the role after the newspaper decided to invest in regular fashion coverage in 2002. In 2019 the British newspaper announced Ellison will succeed longtime How to Spend It editor Gillian de Bono.

Publications 

 Vogue: The Gown, 2017,

References 

Year of birth missing (living people)
Living people
21st-century British journalists
English women journalists
English fashion journalists
Fashion editors
Financial Times people
Alumni of the University of Edinburgh
British Vogue
People from Cambridge
21st-century English women
21st-century English people